Cabalus is a genus of birds in the family Rallidae.

It contains the following species:

 New Caledonian rail, Cabalus lafresnayanus
 Chatham rail, Cabalus modestus (extinct)

References

 
Bird genera
Bird genera with one living species